SM U-4 was one of the 329 submarines serving in the Imperial German Navy in World War I. She was partially broken up in 1919 with her hull being sold on.

References

Bibliography

World War I submarines of Germany
1909 ships
U-boats commissioned in 1909
Ships built in Danzig
Type U 3 submarines